Asham may refer to:

 Asham (dessert), Caribbean corn-based dessert
 Asham Quarry, geological site in East Sussex, England
 Asham Wood, biological site in Somerset, England
 Arron Asham (born 1978), Canadian ice hockey right winger
 Guilt offering (Hebrew: asham), a type of Biblical sacrifice

See also 
 Ash-Shām, the area known as Greater Syria, synonymous with (or part of) the Levant